The radial recurrent artery arises from the radial artery immediately below the elbow.

It ascends between the branches of the radial nerve, lying on the supinator muscle and then between the brachioradialis muscle and the brachialis muscle, supplying these muscles and the elbow-joint, and anastomosing with the terminal part of the profunda brachii.

Additional images

References

External links
 
 

Arteries of the upper limb